Joseph Connellan, known as Joe Connellan (died 11 April 1967) was a nationalist politician and newspaper editor in Ireland.

Connellan joined Sinn Féin in 1908 and was prominent in the Newry Sluagh.  Later in life, he was active in the Gaelic League and was the Senior Vice President of the Ulster Council of the National Athletic and Cycling Association of Ireland.

Connellan was elected to the Newry Board of Governors in 1920, serving until 1922.  At the 1929 Northern Ireland general election, he was elected in South Armagh, but stood down in 1933.

In 1949, Connellan was elected to the Northern Ireland House of Commons, representing South Down.  He served until his death as a member of the Nationalist Party, and was regarded as a member of the right wing of the party.  He was also a member of Newry Urban District Council and the Chairman of the National Popular Front in 1964.  From 1965 until 1967, he served as the Shadow Minister of Education.

References

Year of birth missing
1967 deaths
Councillors in County Armagh
Councillors in County Down
Members of the House of Commons of Northern Ireland 1929–1933
Members of the House of Commons of Northern Ireland 1949–1953
Members of the House of Commons of Northern Ireland 1953–1958
Members of the House of Commons of Northern Ireland 1958–1962
Members of the House of Commons of Northern Ireland 1962–1965
Members of the House of Commons of Northern Ireland 1965–1969
Nationalist Party (Ireland) members of the House of Commons of Northern Ireland
Journalists from Northern Ireland
Columnists from Northern Ireland
Male non-fiction writers from Northern Ireland
Members of the House of Commons of Northern Ireland for County Armagh constituencies
Members of the House of Commons of Northern Ireland for County Down constituencies
People from Newry
Politicians from County Armagh